The 2014 Chinese Football Association Division Two League season was the 25th season since its establishment in 1989. It was divided into two groups, North and South. There were 17 teams participating in the league, 8 teams in North Group and 9 teams in South Group. The league was made up of two stages, the group stage and the play-off. The group stage was a double round-robin format. Each team in the group played the other teams twice, home and away. It started on April 26 and ended on September 13. The play-off stage was a two-legged elimination. It started on September 27. At the end of the season, the two finalists of the play-off qualified for promotion to 2015 China League One.

Team changes

Promotion and relegation 
Teams promoted to 2014 China League One
 Qingdao Hainiu 
 Hebei Zhongji

Teams relegated from 2013 China League One
 Guizhou Zhicheng

Dissolved entries 
 Chongqing F.C.
 Gansu Aoxin
 Dali Ruilong
 Liaoning Youth
 Qinghai Senke
 Shaanxi Laochenggen
 Shenzhen Fengpeng

New entries 
 Dalian Transcendence  
 Fujian Broncos  
 Hebei Elite  
 Nanjing Qianbao  
 Pu'er Wanhao  
 Sichuan Leaders  
 Sichuan Longfor  
 Yinchuan Helanshan

Name changes 
 Shanxi Jiayi changed its name to Taiyuan Zhongyou Jiayi in January 2014.

Clubs

Clubs Locations

Group stage standings

North Group

South Group

Group stage results

North Group

South Group

Play-offs

Quarter-finals

First leg

Second leg

Semi-finals

First leg

Second leg

Third-Place Match

Final Match

Top scorers

References

External links
Official site 
News and results at Sohu.com 

3
China League Two seasons